General Atomics Aeronautical Systems, Inc. (GA-ASI) is a military contractor and subsidiary of General Atomics that designs and manufactures unmanned aerial vehicles and radar systems for the U.S. military and commercial applications worldwide.

Operations
In November 2021, GA-ASI received a $103.2 million contract from the U.S. Army and a $31.7 million contract from the U.S. Navy on behalf of Belgium.

On December 9, 2021, GA-ASI unveiled the General Atomics Mojave drone.

On February 1, 2023, GA-ASI along with partner Maritime Applied Physics Corporation won a Phase 1 research contract on DARPA's Liberty Lifter project.

Products
 General Atomics Gnat
 General Atomics Prowler
 General Atomics Altus
 General Atomics MQ-1 Predator
 General Atomics MQ-1C Gray Eagle
 General Atomics MQ-9 Reaper
 General Atomics MQ-20 Avenger
 General Atomics Mojave
 General Atomics Sparrowhawk
 General Atomics Gambit series Collaborative combat aircraft (CCA)

References

External links
 General Atomics Aeronautical Systems

Companies based in San Diego
Aerospace companies of the United States
Aircraft manufacturers of the United States